Sainte-Angèle-de-Laval is a community of the city of Bécancour, Quebec.  Bordering the Saint Lawrence River, Sainte-Angèle-de-Laval has a strong naval history; among other things, a Sea Cadet training centre, the CSTC HMCS Quebec, used to operate there during the summer.  The quay is also host to the biggest analemmatic sundial in North America, and the only one in the province of Quebec.

References

Neighbourhoods in Bécancour
Populated places disestablished in 1965